Halocoryza arenaria is a species of brown coloured ground beetle in the subfamily Scaritinae which was described by Darlington in 1939.

Distribution
It is found on Barbados, Dominican Republic, Grenada, Guadeloupe, Jamaica, Puerto Rico, Virgin Islands, as well as Brazil, and Panama. It is also native to Cameroon. and was recorded from Florida, United States and East coast of Mexico such as Quintana Roo, Puerto Juarez, and Yucatan Peninsula.

References

Beetles described in 1939
Beetles of Africa
Beetles of North America
Beetles of South America
Scaritinae